Queen Janggyeong of the Gangneung Kim clan was a Goryeo royal family member as the first and eldest daughter Duke Gangneung, grandson of King Munjong who became a queen consort through her marriage with her half second cousin once removed, King Uijong as his first and primary wife. Since the same clan couldn't get married, so she became the 12th reigned Goryeo queen who followed her maternal clan after Queen Gyeonghwa and the eldest among Marchioness Daeryeong, Queen Uijeong, and Queen Seonjeong.

Biography

Palace life
Although after changed her clan and become a Queen Consort, but sometimes, she still recognized like her biological lineage. She married Uijong when he still become a Crown Prince and thought that she was in a very influential position within the royal family. Meanwhile, after her husband ascended the throne, she then given the Royal title of Princess Heungdeok (흥덕궁주, 興德宮主) in 1151 and two years after she gave birth into their first son, Crown Prince Hyoryeong in 1149 whom later formally became Crown Prince in 1153. Beside him, she also bore Uijong their other three daughters.

It was said that before Hyoryeong was born, both Gim and Uijong vowed to make "4 Copies of Hwaeom Sutra" (화엄경 4부) using Gold and Silver characters if they had a son. Then, after the prince was born, the second copies was copied and stored in Heungwang Temple, Honggyo-won. At this time, an inauguration ceremony was held. Later in 1170, during Jeong Jung-bu (정중부)'s conspiracy to deposed and killed Uijong, the Queen got exiled to Jindo-hyeon and was believed to assassinated and died there.

Death and Posthumous name
It was unknown when the Queen died since there were no records about this, but after her death, she then buried in Huireung Tomb (희릉, 禧陵) along with her husband, King Uijong.
In October 1253 (40th year reign of King Gojong), named Hye-ja (혜자, 惠資) was added to her Posthumous name.

Family 
 Father - Wang On, Duke Gangneung (강릉공 왕온) (? - 1146)
 Grandfather - Wang Hwi, Munjong of Goryeo (고려 문종) (29 December 1019 - 2 September 1083)
 Grandmother - Royal Consort Ingyeong of the Incheon Lee clan (인경현비 이씨)
 Mother - Lady Kim of the Gangneung Kim clan (강릉 김씨)
 Grandfather - Kim Go (김고, 金沽) (? - 1123)
 Grandmother - Lady Lee of the Incheon Lee clan (인천 이씨)
 Siblings 
 Younger sister - Lady Wang of the Kaeseong Wang clan (개성 왕씨)
 Brother-in-law - Wang Gyeong, Marquess Daeryeong (대령후) (1130 - 1167?)
 Younger sister - Queen Uijeong of the Gangneung Kim clan (의정왕후 김씨) (? - 1170?)
 Brother-in-law - Wang Ho, Myeongjong of Goryeo (고려 명종) (8 November 1131 - 3 December 1202)
 Nephew - Wang Oh, Gangjong of Goryeo (고려 강종) (10 May 1152 - 26 August 1213)
 Niece - Princess Yeonhui (연희궁주)
 Nephew-in-law - Wang Jin, Marquess Yeongin (영인후 왕진) (? - 1220)
 Grandnephew - Wang Jeong, Duke Hoean (회안공 정) (? - 1234)
 Grandniece - Queen Seongpyeong of the Im clan (성평왕후 임씨) (? - 25 September 1247)
 Niece - Princess Suan (수안궁주) (? - 23 June 1199)
 Nephew-in-law - Wang Woo, Marquess Changgwa (창화후 왕우)
 Grandnephew - Wang Hyeon (왕현, 王泫)
 Grandniece - Crown Princess Wang (태자비 왕씨)
 Younger sister - Queen Seonjeong of the Gangneung Kim clan (선정왕후 김씨) (? - 1222)
 Brother-in-law - Wang Tak, Sinjong of Goryeo (고려 신종) (11 November 1144 - 15 February 1204)
 Nephew - Wang Yeong, Huijong of Goryeo (고려 희종) (22 June 1181 - 31 August 1237)
 Niece-in-law - Crown Princess Wang (태자비 왕씨); Princess Suan’s daughter
 Niece-in-law - Queen Seongpyeong of the Im clan (성평왕후 임씨) (? - 25 September 1247); Princess Yeonhui’s daughter
 Nephew - Wang Seo, Duke Yangyang (양양공 왕서)
 Niece - Princess Hyohoe (효회공주) (1183 - 1199)
 Niece - Princess Gyeongnyeong (경녕궁주) 
 Nephew-in-law - Wang Jeong, Duke Hoean (회안공 정) (? - 1234)
 Younger brother - Wang Yeong, Marquess Gonghwa (공화후 왕영) (1126 - 1186)
 Sister-in-law - Princess Seunggyeong (승경궁주) (? - 1158)
 Niece - Lady Wang of the Kaeseong Wang clan (개성 왕씨) (1150 - 1185)
 Nephew - Wang Myeon, Duke Gwangreung (광릉공 왕면) (? - 1218)
 Niece-in-law - Princess Hwasun (화순궁주)
 Younger brother - Wang Jak (왕작, 王鷟)
 Husband - Wang Hyeon, Uijong of Goryeo (고려 의종) (23 May 1127 - 7 July 1173)
 Mother-in-law - Queen Gongye of the Jangheung Im clan (공예왕후 임씨) (2 October 1109 – 2 December 1183)
 Father-in-law - Wang Hae, Injong of Goryeo (고려 인종) (29 October 1109 - 10 April 1146)
 Issue
 Son - Crown Prince Hyoryeong (효령태자) (4 June 1149 - ?)
 Daughter-in-law - Crown Princess Wang (태자비 왕씨); Princess Deoknyeong’s daughter 
 Grandson (태손) (? - 1170)
 Daughter - Princess Gyeongdeok (경덕궁주) 
 Son-in-law - Wang Pyeong, Duke Yeonchang (연창공 왕평); Princess Seungdeok’s youngest son
 Daughter - Princess Anjeong (안정궁주)
 Son-in-law - Wang Park (함녕백 왕박) (? - 1185); Princess Seungdeok’s second son
 Daughter - Princess Hwasun (화순궁주)
 Son-in-law - Wang Myeon, Duke Gwangreung (광릉공 왕면) (? - 1218); Princess Seunggyeong’s son

In popular culture
Portrayed by Choi Jung-won in the 2003–2004 KBS TV series Age of Warriors.

References

External links
Queen Janggyeong on Encykorea .
장경왕후 on Doosan Encyclopedia .

12th-century births
12th-century deaths
Royal consorts of the Goryeo Dynasty
Korean queens consort
12th-century Korean women